James Dun (born 7 July 1999) is an English rugby union player who plays for Bristol Bears in the Premiership Rugby.

References

External links
Bristol Bears Profile
ESPN Profile
Ultimate Rugby Profile

1999 births
Living people
Bristol Bears players
English rugby union players
Rugby union players from Bath, Somerset
Rugby union flankers